Vastanavis is a genus of parrot-like bird that lived in what is now western India in the Early Eocene.

Footnotes

Eocene birds
Fossil taxa described in 2007
Prehistoric birds of Asia
Prehistoric bird genera